The Rock River Raptors were a professional indoor football team based in Rockford, Illinois. The team was most recently a member of the Continental Indoor Football League. The franchise was established in 2000 as the Tennessee Valley Vipers, a charter member of af2. The franchise was based at the Von Braun Center in Huntsville, Alabama. In 2005, the franchise moved to United Indoor Football as the Tennessee Valley Raptors, to accommodate the Vipers' af2 return to Huntsville, as which point the team owner Art Clarkson announced that the franchise would relocate to Rockford. Coincidentally, Rockford was the site of the first-ever Arena Football game in 1986. The Owner of the Raptors was Art Clarkson. The Raptors played their home games at Rockford MetroCentre in Rockford, Illinois.

Franchise history

2005: Move to UIF
In November 2004, owner Ark Clarkson announced that the team would be leaving af2 and would be joining the newly formed United Indoor Football due to what Clarkson claimed as the af2 not performing its obligations to the team operators to meet increasing financial demands on the teams. The financial demands on the af2 member teams were such that since the league was founded in 2000, numerous teams had gone out of operation. They worked to make the league more financially viable and responsive to the needs of team operators, but were unable to get the organization to change, as well as changing their name to the Tennessee Valley Pythons. Clarkson wasted little time naming veteran coach, Dick Adams, as the team's head coach. In late January, the team changed their name to the Tennessee Valley Raptors, after the af2 objected that the Pythons would spark people to become confused with the former af2 Vipers.

On October 1, 2007, the Raptors announced they would not play in the UIF in 2008.  Eighteen days later, they announced they would move to the CIFL to begin play there for the 2008 season.

Logos and uniforms

Season-by-season 

|-
| colspan="6" align="center" | Tennessee Valley Raptors (UIF)
|-
|2005 || 6 || 9 || 0 || 3rd South || Won Round 1 (Fort Wayne)Lost Semifinals (Sioux City)
|-
| colspan="6" align="center" | Rock River Raptors (UIF)
|-
|2006 || 11 || 4 || 0 || 1st Central || Won Round 1 (Sioux City)Lost Semifinals (Lexington)
|-
|2007 || 10 || 5 || 0 || 1st East || Lost Round 1 (Bloomington)
|-
| colspan="6" align="center" | Rock River Raptors (CIFL)
|-
|2008 || 7 || 5 || 0 || 2nd Great Lakes West || Won GLD West Finals (Chicago)Lost GLD Championship (Kalamazoo)
|-
|2009 || 7 || 5 || 0 || 3rd Western || --
|-
!Totals || 41 || 28 || 
|colspan="2"| (including playoffs)

References

External links
 Raptors website
 Raptors' 2005 stats
 Raptors' 2006 stats
 Raptors' 2007 stats
 Raptors' photos

American football teams in Illinois
Defunct indoor American football teams
Former Continental Indoor Football League teams
Sports teams in Rockford, Illinois
United Indoor Football teams
American football teams established in 2005
American football teams disestablished in 2009
2005 establishments in Illinois
2009 disestablishments in Illinois